"DHL" is a song by Frank Ocean, released as a single on October 19, 2019. Prior to being released for digital download and streaming, the track was premiered at the end of Ocean's Beats 1 radio show, Blonded Radio. Its release follows a day after Ocean announced the tracks "Cayendo" and "Dear April". It is Ocean's first release since his cover of "Moon River" was released in February 2018 and it is his first original song since releasing "Provider" in August 2017.

The song was called "dark" and "spacey" by The Fader.

Critical reception
Sheldon Pearce for Pitchfork called Ocean's performance "as cavalier as he’s ever sounded, and it suits him."

Charts

References

2019 singles
2019 songs
Frank Ocean songs
Songs written by Frank Ocean
Songs written by Boys Noize